Kieran McKenna (born 14 May 1986) is a Northern Irish professional football manager and former player, who is currently the manager of EFL League One side Ipswich Town.

McKenna began his footballing career as a youth team player at Northern Irish sides Enniskillen Town United and Ballinamallard United. He joined Tottenham Hotspur as a youth player in 2002 after signing a scholarship contract. In 2009, at the age of 22, McKenna was forced to retire from playing as a result of a hip injury; resulting in McKenna failing to make a full senior team appearance for Tottenham.

McKenna represented the Northern Ireland national team at under-19 and under-21 level.

After retiring from playing, McKenna started his career in coaching within the Tottenham Hotspur academy. He progressed through the academy at Tottenham, becoming the club's under-18s manager in 2015. 

In 2016, he left Tottenham to take up the under-18s manager position at Manchester United. 

In 2018, McKenna was promoted to become Manchester United's assistant manager under José Mourinho. He worked with the first-team at Manchester United until December 2021, where he left to become the manager of Ipswich Town.

Playing career
McKenna was a youth footballer at Tottenham Hotspur, before ending his playing career in 2009 due to a hip injury. McKenna went through two years of rehabilitation and had two operations before confirming his decision to retire.

Prior to joining Tottenham, McKenna played for Enniskillen Town United and Ballinamallard United.

He also represented Northern Ireland at both under-19 and under-21 level, of which McKenna represented his country in the UEFA European Under-21 Championship Qualifiers.

Coaching career

Tottenham Hotspur
After retiring from playing, McKenna started a career in coaching whilst studying a degree in Sports Science at Loughborough University. During his time studying, McKenna spent time as a youth coach at Tottenham Hotspur, Leicester City and Nottingham Forest. 

McKenna also spent two months with the Vancouver Whitecaps in Canada as a guest coach at the end of his first academic year. Upon graduating from Loughborough University, McKenna was hired as the Head of Academy Performance Analysis at Tottenham Hotspur.

McKenna has since revealed that he almost joined the academy coaching staff at Liverpool, of which he would have succeeded Alex Inglethorpe, who was promoted from Academy Coach to Academy Director, however McKenna decided to stay at Tottenham. Following a period of coaching a variety of age groups within the Tottenham Academy set-up, McKenna was placed in charge of Tottenham Hotspur's under-18s side.

During his tenure at Tottenham, McKenna guided the under-18s to the semi-final of the FA Youth Cup in 2015. He departed a year after his appointment as under-18s manager at Tottenham, having accepted the opportunity to serve the same role for Tottenham’s Premier League rivals Manchester United.

Manchester United
On 29 August 2016, it was confirmed that McKenna was to leave his role at Tottenham to join the academy set-up at Manchester United, becoming the club's under-18s manager. In his second season in charge of the under-18s, McKenna guided Manchester United to the Premier League Northern Division title.

On 1 July 2018, along with former United player Michael Carrick, McKenna was promoted to the first-team coaching staff and replaced Rui Faria as José Mourinho's assistant manager, ahead of the 2018/19 Premier League season.

Following a poor start to the 2018/19 season, Mourinho left United on 18 December 2018, and was replaced the next day by club legend Ole Gunnar Solskjær, who was appointed as caretaker manager. Despite reports suggesting that the managerial change would result in the recruitment of a new coaching team, both McKenna and Carrick retained their positions under Solskjær. 

Following Solskjær’s departure in November 2021, McKenna retained his position as first-team coach under new interim manager Ralf Rangnick.

Ipswich Town
On 16 December 2021, McKenna was appointed as manager of Ipswich Town, signing a three-and-a-half year contract. He officially took charge on 20 December, alongside his assistant Martyn Pert. 

McKenna’s first game in charge of Ipswich saw his side win 1–0 against Wycombe Wanderers at Portman Road. 

McKenna's first away game in charge was a 4–0 win against Gillingham. 

McKenna's arrival saw a quick upturn in Ipswich's form, with the team's results and performances much improved. Ipswich won seven of McKenna's first 10 games in charge, keeping seven clean sheets in the process. Under McKenna, Ipswich went 11 matches unbeaten through February and March, including setting a new club record for not conceding a goal, surpassing the previous record of 547 minutes. 

Despite the improvement in form, Ipswich were unable to make up the ground required to reach the League One play-offs, eventually finishing in 11th place in League One. Ipswich ended the season with a 4–0 home win against Charlton Athletic on 30 April.

Reception
Following McKenna’s arrival as Manchester United's under-18s manager, Indy Boonen, who was a teenage player for United at the time, praised McKenna by stating, "He changed everything. The way we trained was how the opponent played on the Saturday. If you played against West Brom, you trained how they are and focused on their weaknesses."

Jim Magilton, the Irish Football Association's elite performance director, agreed with Boonen's appraisal of McKenna commenting, "He is a meticulous planner yet every session is spontaneous. Nothing is set in stone. He adjusts the session to how the players are and gets what he wants out of the session. Everything is linked and game related. Nothing is for show – it has to be about the game."

Personal life
McKenna was born in London but was raised in the Northern Irish county of County Fermanagh.

Since his childhood, McKenna has been a supporter of Manchester United, with reports claiming that his love for the club persuaded his decision to leave Tottenham Hotspur for the Red Devils in 2016.

McKenna also played underage Gaelic football for the Enniskillen Gaels club.

Managerial statistics

Honours

Manager
Manchester United U18
U18 Premier League Northern Division: 2017/18

References

External links
Kieran McKenna profile at the Ipswich Town F.C. website

1986 births
Living people
Sportspeople from County Fermanagh
Enniskillen Gaels Gaelic footballers
Gaelic footballers who switched code
Association football midfielders
Northern Ireland youth international footballers
Northern Ireland under-21 international footballers
Association football coaches
Tottenham Hotspur F.C. non-playing staff
Manchester United F.C. non-playing staff
Football managers from Northern Ireland
Ipswich Town F.C. managers
English Football League managers
Irish expatriate sportspeople in England
Ballinamallard United F.C. players
Association footballers from Northern Ireland